Kolchenko is a Ukrainian surname. Notable people with the surname include:

 Oleksandr Kolchenko (born 1988), Ukrainian basketball player
 Olexandr Kolchenko (born 1989), Ukrainian activist

See also
 

Ukrainian-language surnames